This is a list of Bangladeshi films that was released in 2013.

January–March

April–June

July–September

October–December

See also

 List of Bangladeshi films of 2014
 List of Bangladeshi films
 Cinema of Bangladesh

References

Film
Bangladesh
 2013